"The Joker" is a song by Leslie Bricusse and Anthony Newley, from the 1964 musical The Roar of the Greasepaint – The Smell of the Crowd.

Plot 
The song is a lament of a person, seen by the outside world as a jester and a comedian especially when they fail, who inwardly feels tremendous pain. The person ultimately accepts their fate, noting that someone is in the same position in every society. In the musical, the song—sung by the lead, Cocky (played by Newley in the original American production)—leads into the Act One closer, "Who Can I Turn To?"

Recordings
 Anthony Newley performed the song on the original cast recording.
 Sammy Davis Jr., on the album, Sammy's Back On Broadway 1965
 Bobby Rydell, on the TV show Shindig!
 Sérgio Mendes, on the 1966 album, Herb Alpert Presents Sergio Mendes & Brasil '66
 Wes Montgomery, did an instrumental version on the 1967 album, A Day In The Life.
 Shirley Bassey, on the 1968 album, This Is My Life.
 Fred Travalena, as a lip-sync performance on the 1989 Macy's Thanksgiving Day Parade (in character as the DC Comics villain of the same name)
 Mark Trevorrow, on the 2004 album, It's About Time.
 Gina Riley performed and recorded her version as the opening only theme to the Australian sitcom, Kath & Kim. This full recording also appeared on the 2004 soundtrack album, Kath & Kim's Party Tape.

References

Songs written by Anthony Newley
1964 songs
Songs written by Leslie Bricusse
Songs from musicals